World Series of Fighting 14: Ford vs. Shields was a mixed martial arts event held  in Edmonton, Alberta, Canada. This event aired on NBCSN in the U.S and on TSN2 in Canada.

Background

Ryan Ford faced former Strikeforce Middleweight Champion Jake Shields at this event.

Smealinho Rama and Derrick Mehmen fought for the inaugural WSOF Heavyweight Championship at this event.

Michael Hill was expected to face Marcus Hicks but after Hicks failed to make weight on short notice Hill declined the Catchweight bout which caused the fight to be canceled.

Results

See also 
 World Series of Fighting
 List of WSOF champions
 List of WSOF events

References

Events in Edmonton
World Series of Fighting events
2014 in mixed martial arts